Igor Burzanović (Serbian Cyrillic: Игop Буpзaнoвић, born on 25 August 1985 in Podgorica) is a Montenegrin retired international football player who last played for Iskra Danilovgrad.

Club career
He was a member of FK Budućnost Podgorica since he started playing first team football. In following years Burzanović was the star player on the team. He was considered one of the most promising Montenegrin players.

Burzanović signed for Serbian giants Red Star Belgrade from FK Budućnost Podgorica in December 2006, joining the team on 8 January 2007. He has since then been a valuable member of the team. In 2009 Igor returned to his first club FK Budućnost Podgorica. After scoring 10 goals there, he moved to Japan to play for Nagoya Grampus.

In August 2012, Burzanović signed for Buriram United for a trial period which ended quickly. In August 2013, he signed again for Buducnost Podgorica.

In February 2014, Burzanović signed for Kazakhstan Premier League side FC Irtysh Pavlodar, leaving the club in December of the same year after one season.

On 30 January 2015, Burzanović transferred to China League One side Hunan Billows. In February 2016, Burzanović once again returned to his boyhood club Budućnost, signing a contract until the end of season.

International career
As early as 2002, he was part of the FR Yugoslavia U-17 team at the 2002 UEFA European Under-17 Football Championship.

Burzanović was a constant member of Serbia and Montenegro national under-21 football team. On 8 June 2005, Burzanović earned his first and only cap for Serbia and Montenegro as a substitute for Miloš Marić in the third minute of second-half stoppage time against Italy. The friendly match, which took place in the Canadian city of Toronto, finished as a 1–1 draw. When the state-union of Serbia and Montenegro was dissolved in May 2006, Burzanović opted to represent his native Montenegro on the international scene, and played in the first match of the Montenegro national football team in 2007, where he scored the game-winning goal from a penalty shot in a 2–1 victory over Hungary.

He was officially acknowledged as Montenegro's best player and received the award in 2004.

Club statistics

International Goals
Scores and results list Montenegro's goal tally first.

References

External links
 
 
 
 Igor Burzanović at Srbijafudbal.net
 

1985 births
Living people
Footballers from Podgorica
Association football midfielders
Serbia and Montenegro footballers
Serbia and Montenegro under-21 international footballers
Serbia and Montenegro international footballers
Montenegrin footballers
Montenegro international footballers
Dual internationalists (football)
FK Budućnost Podgorica players
Red Star Belgrade footballers
Nagoya Grampus players
Igor Burzanovic
FC Irtysh Pavlodar players
Hunan Billows players
OFK Petrovac players
FK Iskra Danilovgrad players
First League of Serbia and Montenegro players
Serbian SuperLiga players
Montenegrin First League players
J1 League players
Igor Burzanovic
Kazakhstan Premier League players
China League One players
Montenegrin expatriate footballers
Expatriate footballers in Serbia
Montenegrin expatriate sportspeople in Serbia
Expatriate footballers in Japan
Montenegrin expatriate sportspeople in Japan
Expatriate footballers in Thailand
Montenegrin expatriate sportspeople in Thailand
Expatriate footballers in Kazakhstan
Montenegrin expatriate sportspeople in Kazakhstan
Expatriate footballers in China
Montenegrin expatriate sportspeople in China